

E
 EACH - East Camden and Highland Railroad
 EACU - East Asiatic Company
 EAGX - Eaglebrook, Inc.
 EAMX - Everest Railcar Services, Inc.
 EARY - Eastern Alabama Railway
 EASO - EASX Corporation
 EASU - Waterfront Container Leasing Company
 EASZ - Waterfront Container Leasing Company
 EBAX - Ethyl Corporation
 EBBX - Ed Burrier and Associates
 EBGR - Eastern Berks Gateway Railroad
 EBPX - Empire Builder Private Cars
 ECBR - East Cooper and Berkeley Railroad
 ECCX - Ethyl Canada, Inc.
 ECDU - ECDC Environmental, LC
 ECDX - Edwin Cooper, Inc.
 ECGX - Alabama Power Company
 ECIX - Erman Corporation
 ECLX - ELM-Central Rail Leasing, LP
 ECNX - ECN Rail Finance, LLC
 ECO  - Ecorail, Inc.
 ECOX - Eco East
 ECOZ - Ecorail, Inc.
 ECPX - ECC America, Inc.
 ECQX - Engineered Carbons
 ECRX - Econo-Rail Corporation
 ECRZ - Norfolk Southern
 ECTB - East Chattanooga Belt Railway
 ECUX - Exxon Chemical Americas; Exxon-Mobil Corporation
 ECXX - ECDC Environmental, LC
 EDCX - EDC, Inc.
 EDEX - Empire District Electric Company
 EDGX - Alliant Energy
 EDIU - EDI, Inc.
 EDIZ - EDI, Inc.
 EDSX - Exxon Company, USA
 EDW  - El Dorado and Western Railway
 EDZX - Envases de Zacatecas, SA de CV
 EE   - Ellis and Eastern Company
 EEC  - East Erie Commercial Railroad
 EEIX - Electric Energy, Inc.
 EELX - Evans Railcar Leasing Company
 EENX - Equipment Enterprise, Inc.
 EFRR - Effingham Railroad
 EGSX - Entergy Gulf States, Inc.
 EHDX - Luria Steel and Trading Corporation (Erman-Howell Division)
 EHSX - Essex Hybrid Seed Company, Inc.
 EICX - Edlow International Company
 EIDU - Ethyl, SA
 EIRC - Eastern Illinois Railroad
 EIRR - Eastern Idaho Railroad
 EISU - Evergreen International
 EJE  - Elgin, Joliet and Eastern Railway
 EJR  - East Jersey Railroad and Terminal Company
 EK   - Eastern Kentucky Railway; Eastern Kentucky Southern Railway
 EKBU - Keiserling, Ltd.
 EKLU - K Line
 EL   - Erie Lackawanna Railway; Norfolk Southern
 ELCX - Eli Lilly and Company
 ELFX - Electric Fuels Corporation
 ELKR - Elk River Railroad
 ELKX - ELkem Metals Company
 ELS  - Escanaba and Lake Superior Railroad
 ELSX - Kentucky May Coal Company
 ELTX - Soltex Polymers, Inc.
 EM   - Edgemoor and Manetta Railway
 EMAX - EMAS
 EMCU - Evergreen Marine Corporation
 EMCZ - Evergreen International
 EMDX - Electro-Motive Division Leasing
 EMEU - East Med Tanks, Ltd.
 EMHR - East Mahanoy and Hazelton Railroad
 EMHU - EMP
 EMIX - Environmental Management, Inc.
 EMLX - Electro-Motive Division Leasing
 EMMU - Eastern Mediterranean Container Company, Ltd.
 EMPU - REZ-1
 EMPX - Empiregas Equipment Corporation
 EMRY - Eastern Maine Railway
 EMTU - East-Med Tanks International
 EMUU - REZ-1
 EN   - E and N Railway (RailAmerica); Canadian Pacific Railway
 E&N  - E and N Railway (RailAmerica; Canadian Pacific Railway
 ENCX - EN ERCO International, Inc.
 ENDX - GATX de Mexico, SA de CV
 ENEX - Lake Shore Railway Historical Society
 ENGX - Englehard Corporation
 ENPX - Enterprise Products Company
 ENR  - E and N Railway (RailAmerica); Canadian Pacific Railway
 ENRX - United States Enrichment Corporation
 ENSZ - Norfolk Southern
 EOGX - Union Carbide Ethylene Oxide/Glycol Company
 EPAX - Exxon-Mobil Corporation
 EPCX - Enterprise Products Company
 EPIX - EPIC (a division of Synagro)
 EPRY - East Penn Railway
 EPTC - Oregon Pacific Railroad
 EQUX - Equistar Chemicals
 ERBU - Containers for Bulk Haul Kieserling
 ERCU - Erco Industries, Ltd.
 ERCX - Excel Railcar Corporation
 ERDX - Merchants Despatch Transportation Corporation
 ERFU - Ermefer, SA
 ERIE - Erie Railroad; Erie Lackawanna Railway; Norfolk Southern
 ERIX - Eric Dewayne Hopp; ERIX Railcar
 ERLX - Evans Railcar Leasing Company; GE Railcar Services Corporation
 ERSX - Excel Railcar Services, Inc.
 ESCX - First Security Bank National Association
 ESHR - Eastern Shore Railroad
 ESLJ - East St. Louis Junction Railroad
 ESLZ - East St. Louis Junction Railroad
 ESMX - Essem Corporation
 ESRX - Empire State Railcar, Inc.
 ESSU - K Line
 ESSX - Colonial Chemical Company
 ETC  - East Texas Central Railroad
 ETCX - Tennessee Eastman Company; Eastman Chemical Company
 ETL  - Essex Terminal Railway
 ETMX - Etarco Rail Services Corporation
 ETR  - Essex Terminal
 ETRX - Arkansas Power and Light Company
 ETRY - East Tennessee Railway
 ETSX - Emery Tree Service, Inc.
 ETX  - Essex Terminal Railway
 ETTX - Trailer Train Company; TTX Corporation
 EUGX - Far-Mar-Co, Inc.; Farmland Industries, Inc.
 EURX - EuroCan Pulp and Paper Company, Ltd.
 EUSX - Exxon-Mobil Corporation
 EV   - Everett Railroad
 EVAU - Eisenbahn-Vverkehrsmittel, AG
 EVEX - American Colloid Company
 EVRC - Fremont and Elkhorn Valley Railroad
 EVT  - Evansville Terminal Company, Inc.
 EVWR - Evansville Western Railway
 EWG - Eastern Washington Gateway Railroad 
 EWR  - Elkhart and Western Railroad
 EWSX - Indianapolis Power & Light
 EXEX - Commonwealth Edison Company
 EXFU - Exsif
 EXMX - Express Marco Transportation

E